The Ministry of Education (MoE), before 2003 as the Ministry of Knowledge and until 1953 as the Directorate of Knowledge, is a government ministry in Saudi Arabia that is responsible for regulating primary, secondary and higher education in the country. It was established in 1926 by Ibn Saud in the Kingdom of Hejaz and Nejd, six years prior to the unification of Saudi Arabia. Since the amalgamations of the General Presidency for Girls’ Education (GPGE) in 2002 and the Ministry of Higher Education (MOHE) in 2015, it became the sole body which supervises all schools, universities and colleges in the country.

History
In 1926, Sultan of Nejd Abdulaziz Ibn Saud annexed Kingdom of Hejaz and dissolved the government of Hijaz as well as the Sultanate of Nejd and established the Kingdom of Nejd and Hejaz with running a dual monarchy. King Abdul established the Council for Knowledge which focused on education in Hejaz region. He appointed Salih ibn Bakri Shata to head the council. Then Kamil Al Qassab was made the head of the education directorate. The directorate was also headed by the following until 1953: Majid Kurdi, Hafiz Wahba, Muhammad Amin Fuda and Ibrahim Al Shura.

In 1953 King Saud bin Abdulaziz Al Saud established and merged the Directorate of Knowledge to Ministry of Knowledge and appointed Prince Fahd bin Abdulaziz Al Saud as the minister on 24 December 1953. In 1960, Crown Prince Faisal established General Presidency for Girls’ Education. In 2002, King Fahd issued a royal decree which merged General Presidency for Girls’ Education with the Ministry of Knowledge. It was renamed as Ministry of Education on May 1, 2003.

Special Education/Al Noor Institute for the Blind Riyadh

As far back as  1958, Special Education  for  students with  visual and hearing disabilities had been  in existence Saudi Arabia  as fostered by the Special Education Unit of Education Ministry A formal step was taken by the government in 1960 when Riyadh’s Al Noor Institute for the Blind was set-up and subsequently followed by Al Noor Blind Institute of Makkah in 1962 and then others in various regions in the country-  https://saudigazette.com.sa/article/525529. The curriculum is identical with that of general education except where instruction was adapted to meet the needs of students with visual/hearing impairment who  use Braille Method and similar systems to teach  prescribed subjects.

In February 2021, Dr. Abdul Aziz bin Abdullah Al-Othman has been appointed as undersecretary for private universities at the Ministry.

List of ministers

 Fahd bin Abdulaziz Al Saud (1953–1962)
 Abdulaziz bin Abdullah Al Khwaiter (1976–1996)  
 Abdullah bin Saleh bin Obaid (2005–2009)
Faisal bin Abdullah bin Mohammed Al Saud (2009–2013)
Khalid bin Faisal Al Saud (2013–2015)
Ahmed bin Mohammad Al Issa (2015–2018)
Hamad bin Mohammed Al Al-Sheikh (2018–2022)
Yousef bin Abdullah Al-Benyan (2022 - present)

Achievements 
In September 2018, Ministry of Education and the Arizona State University partnered with each other in order to launch Building Leadership for Change Through School Immersion program which would commence from February 2019.

References

External links
  Ministry of Education
 Ministry of Education, Higher Education (MOEHE)

1926 establishments in Saudi Arabia
Saudi
Education